Cloughjordan House is a private residence in Cloughjordan, County Tipperary, Ireland. Built on the site of a tower house that was extended in the 17th and 18th centuries. The present house comprises a central two storey five bay section flanked by two gable fronted sections.

Grounds

The grounds contain the remains of a moat and extensive farm buildings from the 19th and 20th centuries. 
Records from the walled nursery garden have been transferred to the archives of the National Botanic Gardens.

Later use

Still privately owned and occupied the house is occasionally open to the public by prior arrangement and is the location of a cookery school, wedding venue, event destination and B & B accommodation. Concerts were held here during the Cloughtoberfest gypsy jazz and craft brewing festival.

Protection and listing

The property is listed on North Tipperary County Council’s record of protected structures (ref S456 & S458) The National Inventory of Architectural Heritage lists the house as being of special interest in the architectural, artistic, archaeological, historical and social categories.

References

External links

Houses in the Republic of Ireland
Buildings and structures in County Tipperary
Cloughjordan